Lorenzo Perrone (1904–1952) born in Fossano, Province of Cuneo, Italy, was one of a group of skilled Italian bricklayers working under contract to the Boetti company, who were transferred to Auschwitz according to the camp expansion plan.

In the middle of 1944, while he worked on the building of a wall, Perrone met the Jewish-Italian prisoner Primo Levi, after Levi heard Perrone speak in the Piemontese language with a colleague of his (Levi was a native of Turin), and a friendship between the two developed. Until December of the same year, Perrone gave Levi daily additional food from his rations, saving his life; he also gave him a multi-patched garment he would wear under the camp uniform to increase the protection from cold.

Perrone died of tuberculosis in 1952.  On June 7, 1998, Lorenzo Perrone was recognized as one of the Righteous among the Nations by the Yad Vashem museum of Jerusalem.

The names of Levi's children were chosen as a homage to Lorenzo Perrone: his daughter was Lisa Lorenza, and his son Renzo.

References to Lorenzo Perrone in the writings of Primo Levi
From If This Is a Man: 

From Moments of Reprieve:

External links
Perrone on Gardens of the Righteous Worldwide Committee
Primo Levi interviewed by Gabriel Motola
Perrone's story at Yad Vashem website

References

1904 births
1952 deaths
Italian Righteous Among the Nations
20th-century deaths from tuberculosis
Italian bricklayers
Tuberculosis deaths in Italy
People from Fossano